This page lists the winners and nominees for the Soul Train Music Award for Best R&B/Soul Single – Group, Band or Duo. The award was given out every year since the first annual Soul Train Music Awards in 1987. From 1989 to 1992 the award was known as R&B/Urban Contemporary Single – Group, Band or Duo. When the Soul Train Music Awards returned in 2009 the categories of Best R&B/Soul Single – Group, Band or Duo and Best R&B/Soul Album – Group, Band or Duo were consolidated into the Best R&B/Soul Male Artist and Best R&B/Soul Female Artist categories, depending on group gender. Boyz II Men and TLC have won the most awards in this category, with a total of two wins each.

Winners and nominees
Winners are listed first and highlighted in bold.

1980s

1990s

2000s

References

Soul Train Music Awards